The 262nd Infantry Division was an infantry division of the German Heer during World War II.

History 
The 262nd Infantry Division was formed in Mistelbach in Wehrkreis XVII on 26 August 1939, the day of German mobilization, as a division of the fourth Aufstellungswelle. It initially consisted of the Infantry Regiments 462, 482, and 486, as well as the Artillery Regiment 262. The initial divisional commander was Edgar Theisen.

On 28 January 1940, the division passed an infantry battalion to the 296th Infantry Division of the eighth Aufstellungswelle. On 1 October 1940, a third of the division's strength was transferred to the 137th Infantry Division of the eleventh Aufstellungswelle.

The 262nd Infantry Division was posted opposite the Maginot Line in late 1939 and remained there until after the conclusion of the Battle of France. In September 1940, the division was redeployed to occupied Poland, and participated in Operation Barbarossa in June 1941. It advanced via Brody, Zhytomyr, Kiev and Bryansk and was then deployed to the Battle of Moscow. In 1942, it served under Army Group Center. On 15 September 1942, Friedrich Karst replaced Theisen as divisional commander.

In July 1943, the 262nd Infantry Division participated in the Battle of Kursk. On 19 July 1943, Eugen Wößner became the final divisional commander, replacing Karst.

On 2 November 1943, the 262nd Infantry Division was dissolved and restructured into the Division Group 262, under the newly formed Corps Detachment D.

The Division Group 262 was formed into the Grenadier Regiment 192 and assigned to the 56th Infantry Division. The former division's reinforcement units were added to the 277th Infantry Division of the twenty-second Aufstellungswelle on 17 November 1944.

Superior formations

Noteworthy individuals 

 Edgar Theisen, divisional commander between 26 August 1939 and 15 September 1942.
 Friedrich Karst, divisional commander between 15 September 1942 and 19 July 1943.
 Eugen Wößner, divisional commander between 19 July 1943 and 2 November 1943.

References 

Infantry divisions of Germany during World War II
Military units and formations established in 1939
Military units and formations disestablished in 1943